{{Automatic_taxobox
| image = Stilapex montrouzieri 001.jpg
| image_caption = Drawing of a shell of Stilapex montrouzieri
| taxon = Stilapex
| authority = Iredale, 1925
| synonyms_ref = 
| synonyms = 
 Lambertia Souverbie, 1869 (Invalid: junior homonym of Lambertia Robineau-Desvoidy, 1863 [Diptera])
 Stilapex laseroni'' Cotton, 1957 
 Stilifer parva Schepman, 1909 (original combination)
 Stylapex laseroni Cotton, 1957
| type_species= Stilapex lactarius Iredale, 1925 
}}Stilapex is a genus of very small parasitic sea snails, marine gastropod mollusks or micromollusks in   the family Eulimidae.

Species
Species within the genera Stilapex include:Stilapex cookeanus Bartsch, 1917 Stilapex eburnea Schepman & Nierstrasz, 1909Stilapex lactarius Iredale, 1925 (Type taxon)Stilapex montrouzieri Souverbie, 1869Stilapex ophiuraphila Habe, 1976Stilapex parva Schepman, 1909Stilapex polaris Hedley, 1916Stilapex suzuki Habe, 1991Stilapex teremachii Habe, 1958Stilapex thielei Sturany, 1903Stilapex zebra Habe, 1976
Species brought into synonymy
 Stilapex cookeana [sic] : synonym of Stilapex cookeanus (Bartsch, 1917)
 Stilapex koyamai Habe, 1976 : synonym of Peasistilifer koyamai (Habe, 1976)
 Stilapex laseroni Cotton, 1957 : synonym of Stilapex parva (Schepman, 1909)
 Stilapex tokii Habe, 1974: synonym of Echinothuricola tokii (Habe, 1974)

References

 Iredale, T. 1925. Mollusca from the continental shelf of eastern Australia. Records of the Australian Museum 14(4): 243-270
 Souverbie, S.M. 1869. Diagnoses de Mollusques inédits provenant de la Nouvelle-Calédonie''. Journal de Conchyliologie 17: 416-421

External links 

Marine Species Identification Portal

Eulimidae